"The Time of the Oath" is a song and a single made by the German power metal band Helloween taken from the album also named The Time of the Oath.

Single track listing

Personnel
Andi Deris - vocals
Roland Grapow - lead and rhythm guitars
Michael Weikath - lead and rhythm guitars
Markus Grosskopf - bass guitar
Uli Kusch - drums
Choir of the Orchestra "Johann Sebastian Bach", Hamburg, (conducted by Axel Bergstedt)

References

1996 singles
Helloween songs
Songs written by Andi Deris